Jaminy ,, is a village in the administrative district of Gmina Sztabin, within Augustów County, Podlaskie Voivodeship, in north-eastern Poland.

References

Jaminy
Suwałki Governorate
Białystok Voivodeship (1919–1939)
Belastok Region